Adina may refer to:

Places
 Adina, Ghana, a town in the Volta Region of Ghana
 Adina, Khyber Pakhtunkhwa, a town in Swabi District, Khyber Pukhtunkhwa, Pakistan
 Adina, Spain, a parish in Sanxenxo
 Adina, Scythia, an ancient settlement in what is now Romania
 Adina Deer Park, Malda district, West Bengal, a wildlife sanctuary
 Adina Kottige, a village in the state of Karnataka, India
 Adina Mosque, a ruined mosque in West Bengal, India

People
 Adina (given name)
 Aidin (name)

Organisations
 Adina, the former English name of the Chinese bakery chain Addlove
 ADINA, a commercial engineering simulation software program 
 Adina Apartment Hotels
 Adina World Beat Beverages, a manufacturer of coffee, tea and juice drinks based in San Francisco, California

Other uses
 Adina (opera), an 1826 opera by Gioachino Rossini
 Adina (plant), a genus of flowering plants in the family Rubiaceae
 Adina (butterfly), a genus of butterflies in the subfamily Eudaminae

See also
 Adina Megha, a 1970 Odia (Odisha) film
 Adina's Deck, a 2007 American DVD film series about internet safety aimed toward 9- to 15-year-old children
 Menippe adina, a species of crab native to the Gulf of Mexico